Even in the Tremor is the third studio album by American musician Lady Lamb. It was released in April 2019 on Ba Da Bing Records.

Track listing

Personnel

Main musicians
 Aly Spaltro – vocals, guitar, synth, percussion

Production'
 Jake Aron – mixing
 Joe LaPorta – mastering
 Aly Spaltro – producer
 Erin Tonkon – engineer, producer
 Lily Wen – assistant engineer

Additional musicians
 Benjamin Lazar Davis – bass, piano, synth, mellotron
 Jeremy Gustin – drums, percussion
 Ben Lester – pedal steel guitar
 Emily Hope Price – cello
 Emily Jane Price – violin

Artwork
 Aly Spaltro – art direction, graphic layout
 Erica Peplin – art direction
 Shervin Lainez – photography
 G.E. Ulrich – photography

References

External links

2019 albums
Lady Lamb albums
Ba Da Bing Records albums